Outremont is an affluent residential borough (arrondissement) of the city of Montreal, Quebec, Canada. It consists entirely  of the former city on the Island of Montreal in southwestern Quebec. The neighbourhood is inhabited largely by Francophones, and is also home to a Hasidic Jewish community. Since the 1950s, Outremont is mostly residential.

The most important road in Outremont is Côte-Sainte-Catherine Road, where the borough hall is located. The neighborhood's major commercial streets are Laurier Avenue, Bernard Avenue, and Van Horne Avenue.

Geography
A separate city until the 2000 municipal mergers, Outremont is located north of downtown, on the north-western side of Mount Royal – its name means "beyond the mountain" although it encompasses Murray Hill (colline d'Outremont), one of the three peaks that make up Mount Royal. It was named for the house – Outre-Mont – built c. 1830 for Louis-Tancrède Bouthillier, a former Sheriff of Montreal.

The borough is bounded to the northwest by Mount Royal, to the northeast by Villeray–Saint-Michel–Parc-Extension and Rosemont–La Petite-Patrie, to the east by Le Plateau-Mont-Royal and the Mile End district, to the south by Ville-Marie, and to the west by Côte-des-Neiges–Notre-Dame-de-Grâce. The Mount Royal Cemetery is located in the south eastern tip of the borough.

Toponymy

The area was originally known as Côte Sainte-Catherine. The name Outremont came from how it was called at the time by travelers. Travelers who wished to travel north from downtown Montreal had to go "through" the mountain as in "Outre-Mont".

In 1833, Louis-Tancrède Bouthillier built a country residence that he named Outre-Mont; it still exists today on Rue McDougall. The term Outremont gradually becomes the term used to designate the region.

History
In 1875, Louis Beaubien, a federal representative, gets a federal sanction for the village.  To achieve the minimum amount of residence needed, Lous Beaubien counts barns and other farm buildings as residences. The town changes its name from Cote-Sainte-Catherine to Outremont. The village is home to only 300 souls.

In 1927, Outremont became the first place in the world to use a snow blower to clear its streets in the winter. It was the first production model of Canadian inventor Arthur Sicard's Sicard Industries.

Canadian Prime Minister Pierre Elliott Trudeau was born and raised in Outremont.

Features

Outremont is served by the Outremont and Édouard-Montpetit stations on the Blue Line of the Montreal Metro. (Édouard-Montpetit station is actually located in Côte-des-Neiges, but right on the Outremont border).

Major thoroughfares include Avenue Van Horne and chemin de la Côte-Sainte-Catherine, with avenue Bernard and avenue Laurier as the principal shopping and dining areas. The area has a number of trendy restaurants, cafés and shops. Residents include a substantial percentage of expatriates from France. There is also a sizable Hassidic Jewish community, representing about 20% of Outremont's population, which resides mainly in the eastern and northern portions of the borough. Many Jewish synagogues, schools and businesses can be found on avenues Van Horne, Bernard and St-Viateur.

Among the attractions in the mainly residential community are the Mount Royal Cemetery, the Salle Claude-Champagne, the Théâtre Outremont, the Saint-Grégoire-l'Illuminateur Armenian Cathedral and part of the Université de Montréal campus.

Outremont also has a rail yard along its northern border. The rail yard has been purchased by the Université de Montréal and is to be developed to house its hospital complex, its research faculties and the faculty of Health Sciences (Centre Hospitalier de l'Université de Montréal).

Outremont was twinned as a sister city with Oakwood, Ohio and Le Vésinet, France.

Demographics

Home language (2016) 

Mother Tongue (2016)

Politics

Federal and provincial elections
The borough is entirely contained within the federal riding of Outremont and the provincial riding of the Mont-Royal–Outremont

Borough council

The borough is represented on Montreal City Council by its borough mayor alone. The borough is further divided into four districts, each of which elects one borough councillor. The current borough administration was elected in the November 2021 municipal elections.

Education
The Commission scolaire Marguerite-Bourgeoys operates Francophone public schools.

Adult schools include:
 Centre d’éducation des adultes Outremont

Specialized schools include:
 Secondaire Adapté à ta Situation SAS

Secondary schools include:
 École secondaire Paul-Gérin-Lajoie-d'Outremont
 Pensionnat du Saint-Nom-de-Marie

Primary schools include:
 Guy-Drummond
 Lajoie
 Nouvelle-Querbes
 Saint-Germain-d'Outremont
 Buissonnière

The Lester B. Pearson School Board (LBPSB) operates Anglophone public schools.

Public libraries
The Montreal Public Libraries Network operates the Robert-Bourassa Branch in Outremont.

References

External links

 Borough website (in French)
Historical buildings of Outremont on IMTL
 Outremont Restaurants

See also
 Boroughs of Montreal
 Districts of Montreal
 Municipal reorganization in Quebec

 
Boroughs of Montreal
Populated places disestablished in 2002
2002 disestablishments in Quebec
Former municipalities in Quebec
Former cities in Quebec
Mount Royal
Jewish communities in Canada
Orthodox Jewish communities
Orthodox Judaism in Quebec